Ghost Lake is a summer village in Alberta, Canada. It is located between the Bow Valley Trail and the northern shore of the Ghost Lake Reservoir in the Municipal District of Bighorn No. 8.

Geography

Climate

Demographics 

In the 2016 Census of Population conducted by Statistics Canada, the Summer Village of Ghost Lake had a population of 82 living in 36 of its 87 total private dwellings, a  change from its 2011 population of 81.

See also 
List of communities in Alberta
List of summer villages in Alberta
List of resort villages in Saskatchewan

References

External links 

1953 establishments in Alberta
Summer villages in Alberta